Prionapteryx arenalis is a moth in the family Crambidae. It was described by George Hampson in 1919. It is found in the Punjab region of what was British India.

The wingspan is 24–26 mm. The forewings are whitish, uniformly suffused with pale reddish brown and with traces of a sinuous dark line. The hindwings are whitish, strongly suffused with reddish brown.

References

Ancylolomiini
Moths described in 1919